The Bahamas is an overwhelmingly Christian majority country, with adherents of Islam being a minuscule minority. Due to secular nature of the country's constitution, Muslims are free to proselytize and build places of worship in the country. Adherents of Islam represent less than 1% of the population.

History
Some of the early Muslim settlers in the country were brought as slaves from North Africa. In the 1970s, few of Bahamian students embraced Islam while studying abroad and returned home to continue practicing.

Mosques
The country houses the only mosque, which is the Jamaa' Ahlus Sunnah Bahamas Mosque located in Nassau.

See also
 Religion in The Bahamas

References